Hoogkarspel is a railway station in Hoogkarspel, Netherlands. The station opened on 6 June 1885 and is located between Hoorn and Enkhuizen. The station is on the Zaandam–Enkhuizen railway. The station and services are operated Nederlandse Spoorwegen. The current station building dates from 1965.

Train services
The following services currently call at Hoogkarspel:
2x per hour intercity service Enkhuizen - Hoorn - Amsterdam - Utrecht - 's Hertogenbosch - Eindhoven - Roermond - Heerlen (or Maastricht)
2x per hour intercity service Enkhuizen - Hoorn - Amsterdam (peak hours)

Bus service

All services operate to Hoogkarspel, Julianastraat, which is a short walk from the station along the Julianastraat.

External links
NS website 
Dutch public transport travel planner 

Railway stations in North Holland
Railway stations opened in 1885